Stephen Kabamba (born 25 December 1990) is a Zambian footballer.

External links 
 
 

1990 births
Living people
Zambian footballers
Zambia international footballers
Association football defenders
Mufulira Wanderers F.C. players
Kabwe Warriors F.C. players
ZESCO United F.C. players
Green Buffaloes F.C. players
People from Chipata District
Zambia A' international footballers
2016 African Nations Championship players